Stefani Iotova (born 3 November 1992) is a Bulgarian footballer who plays as a forward. She has been a member of the Bulgaria women's national team.

International career
Iotova capped for Bulgaria at senior level during the UEFA Women's Euro 2013 qualifying Group 3, in a 0–3 home loss to Norway on 31 March 2012.

References

1992 births
Living people
Women's association football forwards
Bulgarian women's footballers
Bulgaria women's international footballers